The 2003 Lux Style Awards, officially known as the 2nd Lux Style Awards ceremony, presented by the Lux Style Awards honours the best films of 2002 and took place 22–24 February 2003. This year, the city of Pakistan played host to the Pakistani Film Industry.

The official ceremony took place on 24 February 2003, at the Expo Centre, in Karachi. During the ceremony, Lux Style Awards were awarded in 27 competitive categories. The ceremony was televised in Pakistan and internationally on ARY Digital. Actor Reema Khan hosted the ceremony.

Background 

The Lux Style Awards is an award ceremony held annually in Pakistan since 2002. The awards celebrate "style" in the Pakistani entertainment industry, and honour the country's best talents in film, television, music, and fashion. Around 30 awards are given annually.

Winners and nominees 

Winners are listed first and highlighted in boldface.

Special awards

LUX Icon of Beauty Award 

Babra Sharif

LUX Woman of Substance Award 

Asma Jehangir

Chairman's Lifetime Achievement Award 

Nadeem Baig

Most Promising Emerging Talent 

Fuzön

References

External links

Lux Style Awards
Lux Style Awards
Lux Style Awards
Lux Style Awards
Lux
Lux
Lux